The Accra Mall is a shopping centre in Accra, Ghana, located on the Spintex road adjacent to the Tema Motorway. The mall was commissioned on 4 July 2008. It was founded by late Joseph Owusu Akyaw (1938-2010). It is owned by Atterbury Property Development, Sanlam and the Owusu-Akyaw family.

Facilities
Present are Shoprite, Game, Mr. Price, a South African-based clothing and accessories retailers etc.

References

Companies based in Accra
Shopping malls in Ghana
Economy of Accra
Shopping malls established in 2008
Ghanaian companies established in 2008